λ Octantis, Latinized as Lambda Octantis, is a binary star system in the southern circumpolar constellation of Octans. It is visible to the naked eye as a dim point of light with a combined apparent visual magnitude of 5.27. The distance to this system is approximately 398–409 light years, based on parallax, but it is moving closer with a radial velocity of −10 km/s.

The primary, designated component A, is an aging, yellow-hued star with a stellar classification of class G8-K0III and a visual magnitude of 5.64. Having exhausted the supply of hydrogen at its core, it has expanded and cooled off the main sequence, becoming a giant. At present it is about 200 million years old and has 13 times the girth of the Sun. This star is radiating 102 times the luminosity of the Sun from its swollen photosphere at an effective temperature of 5,048 K.

The magnitude 7.25 secondary companion, component B, is an Am star with a class of kA3hA7VmA8. This notation indicates it has the calcium K line of an A3 class star, the hydrogen lines of a cooler A7 main sequence star, and the metal lines of an A8 star.

References

G-type giants
K-type giants
Am stars
Binary stars

Octans
Octantis, Lambda
Durchmusterung objects
206240
107843
8280
A-type main-sequence stars